Jane Child is the debut album by Canadian singer-songwriter Jane Child, released in 1989 on the Warner Bros. record label. It includes the single "Don't Wanna Fall in Love", which reached number two on the US Billboard Hot 100 and number 22 in the UK Singles Chart.

The album reached No. 49 on the US Billboard 200 chart for the chart week of April 28, 1990 and stayed on the chart for 22 weeks.

Track listing

Personnel
Musicians
Jane Child – lead, backing and harmony vocals; keyboards; synthesizers; synth bass; electric bass; drums; percussion; drum programming
James Harrah – guitars

Production
Jane Child – production
Dave Jerden – recording and engineering on all tracks except "DS 21", "Hey Mr. Jones" and "World Lullabye" and "You're My Religion Now"
Hein Hoven – recording and engineering on "DS 21", "Hey Mr. Jones" and "World Lullabye"
Mark Wolfson – recording and engineering on "You're My Religion Now"
Jon Baker – assistant engineering
Annette Cisneros – additional engineering 
Chris Lord-Alge – mixing 
Greg Fulginiti – mastering

References

External links
 
 

1989 debut albums
Jane Child albums
Warner Records albums